Late Night Republic is an American syndicated late-night television talk show. It is hosted by 24-year-old Jake Sasseville, who also serves as an executive producer. The show features celebrity and "on the street" interviews by Sasseville, sketch comedy bits, and musical performances. It is based in New York, New York.

Sasseville previously hosted The Edge with Jake Sasseville, which he began on local Public-access television cable TV television in Maine in 2001. He said that the new show reflects his maturity. "The humor I used to have was indicative of the age I was at the time,” he said.

Content

Sasseville has said that some show content will come directly from viewers, who may offer content and ideas over social networks, adding that by 2011, the show will be "exclusively" produced by viewers. He has indicated that the audience demographic is 16-to-24-years of age.

Early episodes featured interviews with comedian and actor Michael Ian Black and actress Blanchard Ryan, along with a variety of sketch comedy, interview, and music segments. The show does not appear to tape in a single studio and instead resorts to on-location filming in New York or against a white background.

Distribution

Late Night Republic airs one night a week on Fox, MyTV, and CW stations. Since Sasseville's production company, Jake Entertainment Inc., secures syndication deals with individual stations, timeslots vary by city. In September 2010, Sasseville launched a publicity campaign to keep the show on the air in San Diego, California, after ratings for "The Edge" put "Late Night Republic's" standing in peril on the XETV station.

The program also airs full episodes on its web site.

Sponsorship

By securing funding directly from advertisers instead of television networks, “Late Night Republic” appears to be following a non-traditional financing model. Sasseville heavily promotes the Procter & Gamble Pringles Xtreme brand during the show, including an interactive contest sponsored by Pringles where viewers can submit comedic videos for judging by Sasseville.

He has been quoted saying that he is comfortable with obvious brand integrations into his show. "If you let your audience in to know that this is what you have to do to make sure that you can pay the bills, they get it and they're okay with it," Sasseville told an interviewer. "It's when people start to try to hide it that it becomes slippery slope."

Marketing

In September 2010, Sasseville began visiting 45 cities during the fall season as part of a road trip to promote "Late Night Republic." That trip is sponsored by FRS Healthy Energy, and includes 15 concert performances as part of Sasseville's Pringles Xtreme Campus Tour. We The Kings and J. Cole are the headlining performances on that tour.

Notes

External links
 Late Night Republic (official site)

American late-night television shows